David Alvey is an American politician who served as the mayor/CEO of the United Government of Wyandotte County and Kansas City, Kansas from 2018 to 2021. He was elected on November 7, 2017, when he defeated incumbent Mark Holland. He took office on January 8, 2018.

Alvey lost re-election to Tyrone Garner on November 2, 2021.

References

Politicians from Kansas City, Kansas
Saint Louis University alumni
Year of birth missing (living people)
Living people
Mayors of places in Kansas